Michael O'Connor (born April 27, 1984 in Bermuda) is an international-level swimmer from Bermuda. As of June 2009, he holds the Bermuda Record in the long-course 50 metres butterfly.

He swam at the:
2003 Island Games
2005 World Championships (50m back; 50m & 100m butterfly)
2006 Commonwealth Games (50m back; 50m & 100m butterfly)

References

1984 births
Living people
Commonwealth Games competitors for Bermuda
Bermudian male swimmers
Swimmers at the 2006 Commonwealth Games